Fort McMurray First Nation is a Cree and Chipewyan band government located near Fort McMurray, Alberta. 
It is a member of the Athabasca Tribal Council and a Treaty 8 nation. The Athabasca Tribal Council represents 5 First Nation bands in northeast Alberta. Fort McMurray First Nation is governed by a Chief and two councillors.

The Fort McKay First Nation was originally part of the same Band, but split off in 1942.

Demographics
, the Fort McMurray First Nation had a total population of 870 with 284 members living on reserve and 571 members living off-reserve.

Reserves
Fort McMurray #468 First Nation reserves of ca.  include: 
  
It is not populated.
The population was 191 in 2016 and 274 in 2011.
Gregoire Lake 176A: the population was 130 in 2016 up from zero in 2011.
Gregoire Lake 176B: not populated. 

References

External links
Fort McMurray First Nation Athabasca Tribal Council

Cree governments
Dene governments
First Nations governments in Alberta